Iztaccíhuatl (alternative spellings include Ixtaccíhuatl, or either variant spelled without the accent) ( or, as spelled with the x), is a  dormant volcanic mountain in Mexico located on the border between the State of Mexico and Puebla within Izta-Popo Zoquiapan National Park.

The name "Iztaccíhuatl" is Nahuatl for "White woman", reflecting the four individual snow-capped peaks which depict the head, chest, knees and feet of a sleeping female when seen from east or west. Iztaccíhuatl is to the north of its twin Popocatépetl, to which it is connected by the high altitude Paso de Cortés. The first recorded ascent was made in 1889, though archaeological evidence suggests the Aztecs and previous cultures climbed it previously. It is the lowest peak containing permanent snow and glaciers in Mexico.

Geology 
The summit ridge of the massive  volcano is a series of overlapping cones constructed along a NNW-SSE line to the south of the Pleistocene Llano Grande caldera. There have been andesitic and dacitic Pleistocene and Holocene eruptions from vents at or near the summit. Areas near the El Pecho summit vent are covered in flows and tuff beds post-dating glaciation, approximately 11,000 years ago. The most recent vents are at El Pecho and a depression at  along the summit ridge midway between El Pecho and Los Pies.

Legend of Popocatépetl and Iztaccíhuatl 

In Aztec mythology, Iztaccíhuatl was a princess who fell in love with one of her father's warriors, Popocatépetl. The emperor sent Popocatépetl to war in Oaxaca, promising him Iztaccíhuatl as his wife when he returned (which Iztaccíhuatl's father presumed he would not). Iztaccíhuatl was falsely told that Popocatépetl had died in battle, and believing the news, she died of grief. When Popocatépetl returned to find his love dead, he took her body to a spot outside Tenochtitlan and knelt by her grave. The gods covered them with snow and changed them into mountains. Iztaccíhuatl's mountain is called "White Woman" (from Nahuatl  "white" and  "woman") because it resembles a woman lying on her back, and is often covered with snow — the peak is sometimes nicknamed , "The Sleeping Woman". Popocatépetl became an active volcano, raining fire on Earth in blind rage at the loss of his beloved.

Elevation 
The Global Volcanism Program cites .

Gallery

See also 

List of mountain peaks of North America
List of mountain peaks of Mexico
List of volcanoes in Mexico
List of Ultras of Mexico

References

External links

Descriptions 
 Iztaccíhuatl - Volcano World
 Iztaccíhuatl - Ski Mountaineer

Other 
 Iztaccíhuatl - Stamps
 Legend of The Sleeping Lady and Smoking Mountain

Volcanoes of Puebla
Volcanoes of the State of Mexico
Mountains of Mexico
Landforms of Puebla
Trans-Mexican Volcanic Belt
Geography of Mesoamerica
Locations in Aztec mythology
Landforms of the State of Mexico
North American 5000 m summits
Religious places of the indigenous peoples of North America